The 2015 Tallahassee Tennis Challenger was a professional tennis tournament played on green clay courts. It was the 16th edition of the tournament which was part of the 2015 ATP Challenger Tour. It took place in Tallahassee, Florida, United States between 27 April and 2 May 2015.

Singles main-draw entrants

Seeds

 1 Rankings are as of April 20, 2015

Other entrants
The following players received wildcards into the singles main draw:
  Jean-Yves Aubone
  Benjamin Lock
  Stefan Kozlov
  Tommy Paul

The following players received entry from the qualifying draw:
  Facundo Bagnis
  Sekou Bangoura
  Mico Santiago
  Jose Rubin Statham

Doubles main-draw entrants

Seeds

Other entrants
The following pairs received wildcards into the doubles main draw:
  Benjamin Lock /  Marco Aurelio Núñez
  Stefan Kozlov /  Rhyne Williams
  Terrell Whitehurst /  Terrence Whitehurst

Champions

Singles

  Facundo Argüello def.  Frances Tiafoe, 2–6, 7–6(7–5), 6–4

Doubles

 Dennis Novikov /  Julio Peralta def.  Somdev Devvarman / Sanam Singh, 6–2, 6–4

References
 Combo Main Draw

External links
Official Website

Tallahassee Tennis Challenger
Tallahassee Tennis Challenger